Mongalkote is a village in Mongalkote CD block in Katwa subdivision of Purba Bardhaman district in the state of West Bengal, India.

History
Mongalkote is an ancient place. In the Jataka tale (around 4th century BC) Vessantara, the capital of Shivirattha kingdom was mentioned as a place called Jatuttara. In his publication Sibi Kings Vessantara, His Country and Cultural Heritage, Aswini Kumar Choudhury has mentioned Jetuttara as being located at or near the present day Mangalkota, which was a flourishing place from the Gupta period to the Sena dynasty, but it rose to its greatest heights during Muslim rule. There are graves of five pirs, including Gholam Panjatan. Mosques were built by Danesh Mand and Hussain Shah.

During the long Hindu and Buddhist periods, Mongalkote was obviously an important centre of activity. It is even thought that it had links with adjoining Gopbhum. However, not much is known about the period.

See also - Kogram, for Ujani or Ujaninagar, which included the present day Mongalkote. Binoy Ghosh says that Mongalkote was witness to Hindu-Muslim conflicts at the time of advent of Muslim rule. It is known as a place of eighteen aulias. Regarding this period a description was given to Rakhaldas Bandyopadhaya by Mongalkote resident, Maulavi Mohammad Ismail. According to the description, Mongalkote was ruled by a brave Hindu king Bikramjit Ghosh. 

Seventeen (or eighteen) Muslim religious warriors or ghazis came to defeat the kafirs and occupy Mongalkote. The ghazis were killed, in battle, one by one, and were buried at Mongalkote. In the end a ghazi named Ghaznabi, killed the Hindu king and occupied Mongalkote. That was the beginning of Muslim rule in Mongalkote. The period of conflict was subsequently followed by a long period of amity amongst Hindus and Muslims.

Geography

Physiography
Mangolkote is in the flat alluvial Kanksa Ketugram plain, which lies along the Ajay.

Police station
Mongalkote police station has jurisdiction over Mongalkote CD block. The area covered is 364.05 km2.

Urbanisation
88.44% of the population of Katwa subdivision live in the rural areas. Only 11.56% of the population live in the urban areas. The map alongside presents some of the notable locations in the subdivision. All places marked in the map are linked in the larger full screen map.

Demographics
As per the 2011 Census of India Mongalkote had a total population of 11,537, of which 5,876 (51%) were males and 5,661 (49%) were females. Population below 6 years was 1,508. The total number of literates in Mongalkote was 6,398 (63.79% of the population over 6 years).

Transport
The State Highway 7, running from Rajgram (in Murshidabad district) to Midnapore (in Paschim Medinipur district), passes through Mongalkote.

Education
Mangalkote Government College was established at Mongalkote in 2015. It offers honours courses in Bengali, English, history, political science, sociology and zoology.

Culture
Visiting Mongalkote is a pilgrimage for Muslims. Many fairs and festivals are organised at Mongalkote – the death anniversary of Hamid Daneshmand Bangali is observed in Falgun, death anniversaries of Shah Zakir Ali Kaderi and Makdum Shah Gujrati are also celebrated. The fair of Pir Panchatan is organised. Muslims from different parts of Bengal and beyond come to Mongalkote on these occasions. Special mention may be made of Maulana Hamid Daneshmand, a great scholar. Emperor Shah Jahan had visited him at Mongalkote. There is a mosque near the grave of Daneshmand – it was built under instructions from the emperor. There are several other mosques in Mongalkote.

Healthcare
Mongalkote block primary health centre at Nutanhat functions with 15 beds. In 2012, the average monthly patients attending Mongalkote BPHC were 8,795 and average monthly admissions were 373. It handled 484 annual emergency admissions.

See also - Healthcare in West Bengal

References

Villages in Purba Bardhaman district